Iftekhar Nayem Ahmed (born 20 November 1988) is a Bangladeshi cricketer. He made his List A debut for Barisal Division in the 2006–07 National Cricket League One-Day on 27 March 2007. He made his Twenty20 debut for the Barisal Division in the 8th Bangladesh Games on 22 April 2013.

References

External links
 

1988 births
Living people
Bangladeshi cricketers
Barisal Division cricketers
People from Barisal